The Vale of Grwyney is a community in Powys, Wales.  It follows most of the border between Powys and  Monmouthshire. It takes its name from the river Grwyney (in Welsh, Grwyne) which flows through it into the River Usk. The river Grwyney has two sources, called the Grwyne Fechan and the Grywne Fawr, which both rise in the Black Mountains and converge into one river near Llanbedr before meeting the Usk.

The community includes the villages of Glangrwyney, Llangenny, and Llanbedr. In 2011 the population of The Vale of Grwyney was 738 with 9.4% of them able to speak Welsh. The community is part of the Crickhowell electoral ward and sends a county councillor to sit on Powys County Council.

See also
List of localities in Wales by population

References

Communities in Powys